Pablo Carreño Busta and Rafael Nadal were the defending champions, but chose not to participate this year.

Henri Kontinen and John Peers won the title, defeating John Isner and Jack Sock in the final, 6–3, 3–6, [10–7].

Seeds

Draw

Draw

Qualifying

Seeds

Qualifiers
  Wesley Koolhof /  Artem Sitak

Qualifying draw

References
 Main Draw
 Qualifying Draw

Men's Doubles